Manik Dey (born 18 October 1952) is an Indian politician and member of the Communist Party of India (Marxist). Dey was a member of the Tripura Legislative Assembly from the Majlishpur constituency in West Tripura district. He was ex-minister of Power, Urban Development, Rural Development and Transport in Manik Sarkar Government.

Personal life & political career 
Manik Dey was born on 18 October 1952 in Champaknagar to Chandra Dey and Basanti Dey. He only studied till the 12th grade. Dey was interested in politics from an early age. In 1978, at the age of 26, he became panchayet pradhan of Purba Debendra Nagar. In 1988, he joined the State Committee of the Communist (Marxist) Party. His success as the Member of the Legislative Assembly returned in 1993, when he was elected to the Assembly from Majlishpur, Jirania. In 2003, he became a Cabinet Minister of Manik Sarkar ministry. Dey is the present State Committee President of Centre of Indian Trade Unions.

See also 
Aghore Debbarma
Manik Sarkar
Khagen Das

References 

People from West Tripura district
Communist Party of India (Marxist) politicians
Communist Party of India (Marxist) politicians from Tripura
Living people
Tripura politicians
21st-century Indian politicians
1952 births
Tripura MLAs 1993–1998
Tripura MLAs 1998–2003
Tripura MLAs 2003–2008
Tripura MLAs 2008–2013
Tripura MLAs 2013–2018